Eucalyptus minniritchi is a species of multi-stemmed, spreading mallee that is endemic to Central Australia. It has glossy, brown to grey, "minni ritchi" bark on the trunk, elliptical to egg-shaped adult leaves, flower buds mostly in groups of seven, pale creamy yellow flowers and conical to hemispherical fruit.

Description
It has glossy, reddish brown, minni ritchi bark that peels in thin strips to reveal reddish or greenish new bark. Flowering usually occurs after rainfall and the flowers are pale creamy yellow. The species has characters intermediate between E. orbifolia and E. websteriana but is distinct from both.

Taxonomy and naming
Eucalyptus minniritchi was first formally described in 2001 by Dean Nicolle in the journal Nuytsia from specimens collected in the Petermann Ranges. The specific epithet (minniritchi) is a reference to the bark of this eucalypt.

Distribution and habitat
This mallee occurs in scattered populations on ridges in the central ranges of Australia, mainly in the Petermann and MacDonnell Ranges. It typically grows between boulders in open mallee shrubland with a Triodia understorey.

See also
List of Eucalyptus species

References

minniritchi
Flora of South Australia
Mallees (habit)
Myrtales of Australia
Plants described in 2001